Krupka is a town in the Czech Republic.

Krupka may also refer to:
Krupka, Łódź Voivodeship, Poland
Krupka (surname)

See also
Krupki, Belarus